The Mixed team compound open is one of three team events held in the 2020 Summer Paralympics in Tokyo, Japan. It contains eleven teams of one man and one woman, the ranking round having been held on 27 August and the knockout stage on 29 August.

Following the ranking round, teams ranked 1st to 5th will immediately go to the quarterfinals while the 6th to 11th teams will have to begin at the 1/8 eliminations. Following the quarterfinals would be the semifinals which then the winners would go to the finals to compete for gold and losers go to the third-place match to compete for bronze.

Team compound Open

Ranking Round 
The points are calculated by combining the score, Xs, and 10s of the two archers, in their team, from their individual ranking round events.

Competition bracket

References

"Ranking rounds ".Archery at the 2020 Summer Paralympics – Team compound open Ranking Round Result.
"Brackets ".Archery at the 2020 Summer Paralympics – Team compound open Ranking Final Round.
IND-TUR Results 
CHN-FRA Results 
GBR-IRI Results 
ITA-RPC Results 
CHN-IRI Results 

Archery at the 2020 Summer Paralympics